The 1st constituency of the Alpes-de-Haute-Provence is a French legislative constituency in the Alpes-de-Haute-Provence département.  The current deputy, Delphine Bagarry was elected as a member of La République En Marche!, but in May 2020, she was one of the 17 initial members of the Ecology Democracy Solidarity group.

List of Deputies

Election results

2022

 
 
 
 
 
 
 
|-
| colspan="8" bgcolor="#E9E9E9"|
|-

2017

2012

|- style="background-color:#E9E9E9;text-align:center;"
! colspan="2" rowspan="2" style="text-align:left;" | Candidate
! rowspan="2" colspan="2" style="text-align:left;" | Party
! colspan="2" | 1st round
! colspan="2" | 2nd round
|- style="background-color:#E9E9E9;text-align:center;"
! width="75" | Votes
! width="30" | %
! width="75" | Votes
! width="30" | %
|-
| style="background-color:" |
| style="text-align:left;" | Gilbert Sauvan
| style="text-align:left;" | Socialist Party
| PS
| 
| 33.04%
| 
| 58.60%
|-
| style="background-color:" |
| style="text-align:left;" | Eliane Barreille
| style="text-align:left;" | Union for a Popular Movement
| UMP
| 
| 23.68%
| 
| 41.40%
|-
| style="background-color:" |
| style="text-align:left;" | Ghislaine Aubert
| style="text-align:left;" | National Front
| FN
| 
| 16.57%
| colspan="2" style="text-align:left;" |
|-
| style="background-color:" |
| style="text-align:left;" | Jean-Louis Pin
| style="text-align:left;" | Left Front
| FG
| 
| 9.83%
| colspan="2" style="text-align:left;" |
|-
| style="background-color:" |
| style="text-align:left;" | Gérard de Meester
| style="text-align:left;" | The Greens
| VEC
| 
| 8.11%
| colspan="2" style="text-align:left;" |
|-
| style="background-color:" |
| style="text-align:left;" | Marie-Anne Baudoui-Maurel
| style="text-align:left;" | Miscellaneous Right
| DVD
| 
| 3.19%
| colspan="2" style="text-align:left;" |
|-
| style="background-color:" |
| style="text-align:left;" | Daniel Ragolski
| style="text-align:left;" | Ecologist
| ECO
| 
| 1.86%
| colspan="2" style="text-align:left;" |
|-
| style="background-color:" |
| style="text-align:left;" | Frédéric Santiago
| style="text-align:left;" | 
| CEN
| 
| 1.52%
| colspan="2" style="text-align:left;" |
|-
| style="background-color:" |
| style="text-align:left;" | Hubert Cabassut
| style="text-align:left;" | Miscellaneous Left
| DVG
| 
| 0.75%
| colspan="2" style="text-align:left;" |
|-
| style="background-color:" |
| style="text-align:left;" | Caroline Alonso
| style="text-align:left;" | Far Left
| EXG
| 
| 0.52%
| colspan="2" style="text-align:left;" |
|-
| style="background-color:" |
| style="text-align:left;" | Joëlle Tebar
| style="text-align:left;" | 
| NCE
| 
| 0.48%
| colspan="2" style="text-align:left;" |
|-
| style="background-color:" |
| style="text-align:left;" | Mireille Carle
| style="text-align:left;" | Far Left
| EXG
| 
| 0.46%
| colspan="2" style="text-align:left;" |
|-
| style="background-color:" |
| style="text-align:left;" | Ludivine Evano
| style="text-align:left;" | Miscellaneous Right
| DVD
| 
| 0.00%
| colspan="2" style="text-align:left;" |
|-
| colspan="8" style="background-color:#E9E9E9;"|
|- style="font-weight:bold"
| colspan="4" style="text-align:left;" | Total
| 
| 100%
| 
| 100%
|-
| colspan="8" style="background-color:#E9E9E9;"|
|-
| colspan="4" style="text-align:left;" | Registered voters
| 
| style="background-color:#E9E9E9;"|
| 
| style="background-color:#E9E9E9;"|
|-
| colspan="4" style="text-align:left;" | Blank/Void ballots
| 
| 1.89%
| 
| 5.04%
|-
| colspan="4" style="text-align:left;" | Turnout
| 
| 62.56%
| 
| 61.66%
|-
| colspan="4" style="text-align:left;" | Abstentions
| 
| 37.44%
| 
| 38.34%
|-
| colspan="8" style="background-color:#E9E9E9;"|
|- style="font-weight:bold"
| colspan="6" style="text-align:left;" | Result
| colspan="2" style="background-color:" | PS HOLD
|}

2007

|- style="background-color:#E9E9E9;text-align:center;"
! colspan="2" rowspan="2" style="text-align:left;" | Candidate
! rowspan="2" colspan="2" style="text-align:left;" | Party
! colspan="2" | 1st round
! colspan="2" | 2nd round
|- style="background-color:#E9E9E9;text-align:center;"
! width="75" | Votes
! width="30" | %
! width="75" | Votes
! width="30" | %
|-
| style="background-color:" |
| style="text-align:left;" | Jean-Louis Bianco
| style="text-align:left;" | Socialist Party
| PS
| 
| 36.40%
| 
| 52.33%
|-
| style="background-color:" |
| style="text-align:left;" | Eliane Barreille
| style="text-align:left;" | Union for a Popular Movement
| UMP
| 
| 38.60%
| 
| 47.67%
|-
| style="background-color:" |
| style="text-align:left;" | Joëlle Tebar
| style="text-align:left;" | Democratic Movement
| MoDem
| 
| 4.82%
| colspan="2" style="text-align:left;" |
|-
| style="background-color:" |
| style="text-align:left;" | Mireille Jouzier-Berges
| style="text-align:left;" | National Front
| FN
| 
| 4.19%
| colspan="2" style="text-align:left;" |
|-
| style="background-color:" |
| style="text-align:left;" | Aurore Hernandez
| style="text-align:left;" | Communist
| COM
| 
| 3.41%
| colspan="2" style="text-align:left;" |
|-
| style="background-color:" |
| style="text-align:left;" | Martine Vallon
| style="text-align:left;" | The Greens
| VEC
| 
| 3.33%
| colspan="2" style="text-align:left;" |
|-
| style="background-color:" |
| style="text-align:left;" | Venise Lafon
| style="text-align:left;" | Far Left
| EXG
| 
| 2.24%
| colspan="2" style="text-align:left;" |
|-
| style="background-color:" |
| style="text-align:left;" | Monique Daniel
| style="text-align:left;" | Hunting, Fishing, Nature, Traditions
| CPNT
| 
| 1.87%
| colspan="2" style="text-align:left;" |
|-
| style="background-color:" |
| style="text-align:left;" | Jean-Claude Silvy
| style="text-align:left;" | Movement for France
| MPF
| 
| 1.42%
| colspan="2" style="text-align:left;" |
|-
| style="background-color:" |
| style="text-align:left;" | Marie-France Lorenzelli
| style="text-align:left;" | Ecologist
| ECO
| 
| 1.04%
| colspan="2" style="text-align:left;" |
|-
| style="background-color:" |
| style="text-align:left;" | Micheline Panisse
| style="text-align:left;" | Far Right
| EXD
| 
| 0.68%
| colspan="2" style="text-align:left;" |
|-
| style="background-color:" |
| style="text-align:left;" | Caroline Alonso
| style="text-align:left;" | Far Left
| EXG
| 
| 0.66%
| colspan="2" style="text-align:left;" |
|-
| style="background-color:" |
| style="text-align:left;" | Bernard Jeanselme
| style="text-align:left;" | Far Left
| EXG
| 
| 0.43%
| colspan="2" style="text-align:left;" |
|-
| style="background-color:" |
| style="text-align:left;" | Catherine Piechota
| style="text-align:left;" | Divers
| DIV
| 
| 0.40%
| colspan="2" style="text-align:left;" |
|-
| style="background-color:" |
| style="text-align:left;" | Noël Chuisano
| style="text-align:left;" | Miscellaneous Right
| DVD
| 
| 0.29%
| colspan="2" style="text-align:left;" |
|-
| style="background-color:" |
| style="text-align:left;" | Jean Milanovic
| style="text-align:left;" | Divers
| DIV
| 
| 0.22%
| colspan="2" style="text-align:left;" |
|-
| colspan="8" style="background-color:#E9E9E9;"|
|- style="font-weight:bold"
| colspan="4" style="text-align:left;" | Total
| 
| 100%
| 
| 100%
|-
| colspan="8" style="background-color:#E9E9E9;"|
|-
| colspan="4" style="text-align:left;" | Registered voters
| 
| style="background-color:#E9E9E9;"|
| 
| style="background-color:#E9E9E9;"|
|-
| colspan="4" style="text-align:left;" | Blank/Void ballots
| 
| 1.94%
| 
| 2.93%
|-
| colspan="4" style="text-align:left;" | Turnout
| 
| 66.59%
| 
| 69.97%
|-
| colspan="4" style="text-align:left;" | Abstentions
| 
| 33.41%
| 
| 30.03%
|-
| colspan="8" style="background-color:#E9E9E9;"|
|- style="font-weight:bold"
| colspan="6" style="text-align:left;" | Result
| colspan="2" style="background-color:" | PS HOLD
|}

2002

 
 
 
 
 
 
 
|-
| colspan="8" bgcolor="#E9E9E9"|
|-

1997

 
 
 
 
 
 
 
|-
| colspan="8" bgcolor="#E9E9E9"|
|-

References

 Official results of French elections from 1998: 

1